William Popp may refer to:
 William Popp (footballer), Japanese football goalkeeper
 William W. Popp, American diplomat
 Bill Popp, Major League Baseball pitcher

See also
 Willian Popp, Brazilian football striker